The 2018–19 UEFA Youth League Domestic Champions Path began on 2 October and ended on 28 November 2018. A total of 32 teams competed in the Domestic Champions Path to decide 8 of the 24 places in the knockout phase (play-offs and the round of 16 onwards) of the 2018–19 UEFA Youth League.

Times are CET/CEST, as listed by UEFA (local times, if different, are in parentheses).

Draw
The youth domestic champions of the top 32 associations according to their 2017 UEFA country coefficients enter the Domestic Champions Path. If there is a vacancy (associations with no youth domestic competition, as well as youth domestic champions already included in the UEFA Champions League path), it is first filled by the title holders should they have not yet qualified, and then by the youth domestic champions of the next association in the UEFA ranking.

For the Domestic Champions Path, the 32 teams were drawn into two rounds of two-legged home-and-away ties. The draw for both the first round and second round was held on 4 September 2018, 14:00 CEST, at the UEFA headquarters in Nyon, Switzerland. There were no seedings, but the 32 teams were split into groups defined by sporting and geographical criteria prior to the draw.
In the first round, the 32 teams were split into four groups. Teams in the same group were drawn against each other, with the order of legs decided by draw.
In the second round, the 16 winners of the first round, whose identity was not known at the time of the draw, were split into two groups: Group A contained the winners from Groups 1 and 2, while Group B contained the winners from Groups 3 and 4. Teams in the same group were drawn against each other, with the order of legs decided by draw.

Format

In both rounds, if the aggregate score is tied after full time of the second leg, the away goals rule is used to decide the winner. If still tied, the match is decided by a penalty shoot-out (no extra time is played). The eight second round winners advance to the play-offs, where they are joined by the eight group runners-up from the UEFA Champions League Path (group stage).

First round

The first legs were played on 2, 3 and 4 October 2018, and the second legs on 23 and 24 October 2018.

|}
Notes

Altınordu won 3–2 on aggregate.

Montpellier won 7–1 on aggregate.

4–4 on aggregate. Hamilton won 3–2 on penalties.

Dynamo Kyiv won 6–1 on aggregate.

Elfsborg won 3–1 on aggregate.

1–1 on aggregate. Anderlecht won on away goals.

Midtjylland won 4–2 on aggregate.

Chelsea won 14–1 on aggregate.

PAOK won 4–1 on aggregate.

Sigma Olomouc won 7–3 on aggregate.

Gabala won 4–2 on aggregate.

Hertha BSC won 5–2 on aggregate.

Astana won 7–1 on aggregate.

Maccabi Tel Aviv won 5–3 on aggregate.

Dinamo Zagreb won 3–0 on aggregate.

Minsk won 4–3 on aggregate.

Second round

The first legs were played on 6 and 7 November 2018, and the second legs were played on 27 and 28 November 2018.

|}

Dynamo Kyiv won 3–2 on aggregate.

Midtjylland won 4–1 on aggregate.

Montpellier won 5–2 on aggregate.

Chelsea won 9–0 on aggregate.

PAOK won 3–1 on aggregate.

Hertha BSC won 4–1 on aggregate.

Dinamo Zagreb won 4–2 on aggregate.

3–3 on aggregate. Sigma Olomouc won on away goals.

Notes

References

External links

2
October 2018 sports events in Europe
November 2018 sports events in Europe